Fighting Texans is a 1933 American Western film directed by Armand Schaefer and written by Wellyn Totman. The film stars Rex Bell, Luana Walters, Betty Mack, Yakima Canutt, Wally Wales and George "Gabby" Hayes. The film was released on June 15, 1933, by Monogram Pictures.

Cast          
Rex Bell as Randy Graves
Luana Walters as Joanne Carver
Betty Mack as Rita Walsh
Yakima Canutt as Hank
Wally Wales as Pete
George "Gabby" Hayes as Pop Martin
Alan Bridge as Gus Durkin
Gordon De Main as Julian Nash 
Lafe McKee as Sheriff Carver
George Nash as Albert

References

External links
 

1933 films
American Western (genre) films
1933 Western (genre) films
Monogram Pictures films
Films directed by Armand Schaefer
American black-and-white films
1930s English-language films
1930s American films